Hardcore Henry (also known simply as Hardcore in some countries) is a 2015 science fiction action film written and directed by Ilya Naishuller (in his feature directorial debut), and produced by Timur Bekmambetov, Naishuller, Inga Vainshtein Smith and Ekaterina Kononenko. Will Stewart provided additional writing for the film.

It stars Sharlto Copley, Danila Kozlovsky, Haley Bennett and Tim Roth. The film was released theatrically in the United States by STXfilms on April 8, 2016. It garnered mixed reviews in the US but was more positively received in Russia. Despite grossing $16.8 million worldwide against a $2 million budget, it was considered a box-office bomb in the US, due to STX spending $10 million to acquire global rights to the film.

Plot

A man wakes inside a laboratory on an airship. A scientist, Estelle, tells him his name is Henry, claims to be his wife, and he has been revived from an accident that left him amnesiac and mute. She replaces his missing limbs with cybernetic prostheses, but mercenaries led by the psychokinetic Akan raid the ship before she can replace Henry's voice. Akan claims all of Estelle's research is his corporate property. He kills Estelle's scientists, but Henry and Estelle flee in an escape pod, landing in Moscow. The mercenaries follow and abduct Estelle.

Henry is rescued by a stranger named Jimmy, who informs him that his cybernetic limbs are running out of power, which will kill him if he cannot recharge. Jimmy is killed by corrupt police paid by Akan, but Henry escapes. He is joined by another Jimmy, now an alcoholic bum, who informs him that one of Akan's associates, Slick Dimitry, has a charging pump which Henry needs to recharge. The two are attacked, and again Jimmy is killed. Henry escapes, and hunts Dimitry through Moscow before capturing him. Just as Dimitry promises him information, he is killed by a sniper. Henry removes the pump and receives a call from Jimmy, who directs Henry to a brothel.

Henry meets two more distinct versions of Jimmy; one a nervous nerd, the other a drug-fuelled sex maniac, who replace his pump. The brothel is attacked by Akan's forces. Akan taunts Henry about Estelle, who is being transported by an armored convoy, before ejecting Henry from the brothel. Outside, Henry encounters another Jimmy, a stoner, who transports him to Akan's convoy. Henry attacks the convoy and locates Estelle and Akan, who beats him with a baseball bat and buries him in the woods.

Jimmy finds and resuscitates Henry, only to be shelled by a tank. After killing the tank crew and fending off a helicopter, Henry finds another Jimmy, who leads him to an abandoned hotel and a hidden laboratory. Here, the original Jimmy—a quadriplegic scientist—reveals that he is seeking revenge against Akan, who crippled him after his own cyborg super-soldiers failed. The other Jimmys are clones based on aspects of Jimmy's personality that he can control via a headset. The clones sing and dance with Henry to the song "I've Got You Under My Skin".

Jimmy realizes that Henry has been unknowingly broadcasting his location to Akan, with a strike force closing in, and the clones attack Henry. Fending off Jimmy, Henry convinces him to help. Henry and the clones fight their way out, killing Akan's forces by collapsing the laboratory on them.

Jimmy and Henry drive to Akan's headquarters. They fight their way into an elevator, but Jimmy is mortally wounded. Before dying, Jimmy thanks Henry for being a friend, and removes a memory blocker, gradually restoring Henry's memories. Henry fights his way to the highest floor, where he is greeted by Akan and an army of cyborg super-soldiers with Henry's memories. The soldiers chase Henry to the roof.

Henry wipes out the entire army to the Queen song "Don't Stop Me Now", before Akan arrives and severely wounds Henry. Estelle arrives and reveals that she is actually Akan's wife. Everything that happened was an elaborate ruse to field-test their ability to manipulate cyborg soldiers into doing anything to "rescue" their "wives", including committing terrorist acts.

Akan and Estelle prepare to board a helicopter, leaving Henry for dead. Henry blacks out, but a memory of his father revives him and motivates him to crush Akan's hands and wrap his robotic eyestalk around Akan's jaw, decapitating him. He jumps onto Estelle's helicopter, presenting her with Akan's head. She shoots Henry, but a bullet ricochets and hits her, causing her to stumble out of the helicopter. Henry slams the door on her hands, sending her plummeting to her death.

Cast
 Sergey Valyaev, Andrei Dementiev, Ilya Naishuller and others as Henry
 Sharlto Copley as Jimmy
 Danila Kozlovsky as Akan
 Haley Bennett as Estelle
 Tim Roth as Henry's Father
 Andrei Dementiev as Dmitry "Slick Dmitry"
 Oleg Poddubnyy as Yuri
 Cyrus Arnold as Nat (credited as "Young Bully #2")
 Ilya Naishuller as Timothy / Higher-Self Merc
 Will Stewart as Robbie
 Martin Cooke as Marty
 Dasha Charusha as Katya, The Dominatrix
 Svetlana Ustinova as Olga, The Dominatrix
 Aleksandr Pal as Mr. Fahrenheit

Henry was originally played by Russian stuntman/camera operator Sergey Valyaev, but the camera rig used in production eventually caused him severe neck pain. The role was given to Andrei Dementiev (who also played Slick Dmitry). Dementiev suffered neck pain as well, in addition to losing a tooth after being accidentally struck by a stuntman. In scenes where Danila Kozlovskiy and Sharlto Copley talked directly to Henry, Valyaev and Dementiev wore shades to prevent the actors from looking at them instead of the camera. In a few scenes, Henry was played by Naishuller himself. Several stuntmen portrayed Henry between scenes—in all, more than ten actors shared the role.

Bodybuilding champion Alexey Karas appeared as a muscular cyborg. Video blogger BadComedian appears in a cameo.

Production

Hardcore Henry was filmed with GoPro cameras mounted on a specially made mask designed by Sergey Valyaev, deemed the "Adventure Mask", and stabilization systems that used either electronics or magnets, created by the movie's director of photography, Vsevolod Kaptur. Many prototypes of the mask were used to film the movie. Between the electronics and the magnet stabilization systems, Naishuller chose the magnets, as he felt that it resembled natural head movement. The recordings from the GoPro cameras were edited to cut the hundreds of shots together into one continuous film.

Blender, open-source software, was used for providing most of the visual effects for the film.

While it was not the first feature film to exclusively use first-person point of view, the concept for the film came from the "Bad Motherfucker" and "The Stampede" music videos, which Naishuller made with Valyaev for his band, Biting Elbows. These were also shot with a GoPro from the first-person perspective. The movie was partially funded with Indiegogo.

Release
The film premiered at the 2015 Toronto International Film Festival on September 12, 2015. The film became one of the highest-profile at the festival, and led to a bidding war between Lionsgate, Universal and STX Entertainment. Ultimately, STX acquired worldwide rights to Hardcore, including a wide release commitment, for $10 million, becoming the studio's first festival acquisition. It was retitled Hardcore Henry for its international release. At the festival, the film won the Grolsch People's Choice Midnight Madness Award. The film was released on April 8, 2016, by STX. On July 26, 2016, Hardcore Henry was released on Blu-ray and DVD.

Reception

Box office
Hardcore Henry has grossed $9.3 million in North America and $7.6 million in other territories for a worldwide total of $16.8 million, against a budget of $2 million.

In the United States and Canada, pre-release tracking suggested the film would gross $7–10 million from 3,015 theaters in its opening weekend, trailing fellow newcomer The Boss ($20–24 million projection) but besting fellow newcomer Demolition ($2–3 million projection). It grossed $380,000 from its early Thursday screenings and $2 million on its first day. It went on to gross $5.1 million in its opening weekend, finishing 5th at the box office. After two weeks, the film was pulled from 2,496 theaters which was the second-largest third-weekend theater drop of all time, behind Meet Dave (2,523 in 2008).

Critical response
On review aggregation website Rotten Tomatoes the film had an approval rating of 51%, based on 149 reviews, with an average rating of 5.6/10. The site's critical consensus reads, "Hardcore Henry seems poised to reinvent the action flick, but without a story or characters worth caring about, its first-person gimmick quickly loses its thrill." Metacritic gives the film a score of 51 out of 100, based on 30 critics, indicating "mixed or average reviews". Audiences polled by CinemaScore gave the film an average grade of "C+" on an A+ to F scale.

In Russia, the film received positive reviews. According to Russian aggregator Kritikanstvo, Hardcore Henry was rated 7.9/10 on average by Russian critics (based on 52 reviews), and received only one negative review.

Max Nicholson of IGN rated the film 8.6/10 stating "Two parts FPS, one part platformer and a pinch of HowToBasic, director Ilya Naishuller's Hardcore Henry is a recipe for non-stop, ludicrous fun. While the film's actual story is nigh inexistent, it's sure to please gamers and action junkies alike with its inventive set pieces and mind-boggling action" and "Hardcore Henry lives up to the title with non-stop, off-the-wall action and a love for all things video games".

Future
Both writer/director Ilya Naishuller and Sharlto Copley said in an interview to TechRadar that they will be willing to make a sequel. Naishuller said:

Due to STXfilms spending $10 million for global rights to the film, the sequel would be very unlikely. This was later proven on July 9, 2020, when Naishuller replied to a fan that a sequel is "very unlikely", but stated possibilities of a spiritual sequel.

References

External links
 
 
 
 
 
 Hardcore Henry first-person perspective review by Russian film participant - English subtitles.

2015 films
2015 science fiction action films
2015 multilingual films
American multilingual films
American science fiction action films
Cyberpunk films
Cyborg films
English-language Russian films
Fiction about memory erasure and alteration
Films about cloning
Films about telekinesis
Films about terrorism
Films set in Moscow
Films shot from the first-person perspective
Russian multilingual films
Russian science fiction action films
STX Entertainment films
Films directed by Ilya Naishuller
Bazelevs Company films
2010s English-language films
2010s American films